5,6-Dibromotryptamine is a substituted tryptamine and indolic alkaloid found in some marine sponges such as Hyrtios sp. found in the South Pacific area. 5,6-Dibromotryptamine is potentially an anti bacterial and anti cancer agent.

See also 
5,6-Dibromo-N-methyltryptamine
6-Bromotryptamine
5-Bromo-DMT

References 

Tryptamine alkaloids
Bromoarenes